The 1998 Campionati Internazionali di Sicilia was a men's tennis tournament played on Clay in Palermo, Italy that was part of the International Series of the 1998 ATP Tour. It was the seventeenth edition of the tournament and was held from 5 October – 11 October.

Seeds
Champion seeds are indicated in bold text while text in italics indicates the round in which those seeds were eliminated.

Draw

Finals

Top half

Bottom half

References

Singles
Campionati Internazionali di Sicilia
Camp